United Left Front may refer to:

India
 United Left Front (1957), an electoral alliance formed ahead of the 1957 West Bengal Legislative Assembly Election
 United Left Election Committee, electoral alliance formed ahead of the 1957 West Bengal Legislative Assembly Election
 United Left Front (1962), an electoral alliance formed ahead of the 1962 West Bengal Legislative Assembly Election
 United Left Front (1967), an electoral alliance formed ahead of the 1967 West Bengal Legislative Assembly Election
 People's United Left Front, formed ahead of 1967 West Bengal Legislative assembly elections and post-elections merged with United Left Front (1967)

Nepal
 The United Left Front (Nepal) (1990), formed to combat autocracy in the country and took part in the Jana Andolan
 The United Left Front (Nepal) (2002), formed to combat the resurgency of autocracy under King Gyanendra

See also
 Left Front (disambiguation)